'Fatima namagari'  is a distinctive rock peak at the northwest end of the Marble Hills in the Heritage Range, Ellsworth Mountains, Antarctica. It was named by the University of Minnesota Ellsworth Mountains Party of 1962–63 because the peak resembles a minaret.

See also
 Mountains in Antarctica

References

Ellsworth Mountains
Mountains of Ellsworth Land